Larry Leslie Brown (born March 1, 1940) is an American former professional baseball infielder, who played for the Cleveland Indians, Oakland Athletics, Baltimore Orioles, and Texas Rangers of Major League Baseball (MLB). His brother, Dick Brown, also played in Major League Baseball.

Pinch-hitting for Tito Francona, he struck out in his first at-bat, but he collected a single in his second plate appearance.

On May 4, 1966, Brown was seriously injured after running into Indians teammate Leon Wagner while playing the New York Yankees in Yankee Stadium. Brown suffered a skull fracture and facial injuries and was admitted to the Lenox Hill Hospital. He was on the disabled list for six weeks, returning to the active roster on June 17. He struck out in one plate appearance as a pinch hitter and played second base for two innings late in the game as Cleveland lost to the Yankees in New York.

In , he lost his starting job to a young Jack Heidemann, and on April 24, 1971, he was sold to the Athletics for an estimated $50,000.
He would end up hitting below .200 during his time with the Athletics, and in  he was signed by the Orioles. He played only 17 games with them that season, batting .250. He finished his career with the Rangers in 1974. He played his final game on September 29 of that year.

Overall, he hit .233 with 47 career home runs and 254 RBI. Brown ranked in the top 5 in sacrifice hits ( and ). He also ranked in the top ten in intentional walks in 1968, and because of his good eye at the plate, he ranked in the top ten for best at-bats per strikeout ratio twice ( and ). His fielding percentage stood at .966.

References

External links

1940 births
Living people
People from Shinnston, West Virginia
Major League Baseball infielders
Baseball players from West Virginia
Cleveland Indians players
Oakland Athletics players
Baltimore Orioles players
Texas Rangers players
Cocoa Indians players
Salt Lake City Bees players